Devosia psychrophila is a psychrophilic, aerobic, Gram-negative, rod-shaped bacteria from the genus of Devosia which was isolated from the Pitztaler Jöchl glacier in the Oetztaler Alps in Tyrol in Austria.

References

External links
Type strain of Devosia psychrophila at BacDive -  the Bacterial Diversity Metadatabase

Gram-negative bacteria
Hyphomicrobiales
Bacteria described in 2012